Kinase insert domain receptor (KDR, a type IV receptor tyrosine kinase) also known as vascular endothelial growth factor receptor 2 (VEGFR-2) is a VEGF receptor. KDR is the human gene encoding it. KDR has also been designated as CD309 (cluster of differentiation 309). KDR is also known as Flk1 (Fetal Liver Kinase 1).

The Q472H germline KDR genetic variant affects VEGFR-2 phosphorylation and has been found to associate with microvessel density in NSCLC.

Interactions 

Kinase insert domain receptor has been shown to interact with SHC2, Annexin A5 and SHC1.

See also 
 Cluster of differentiation
 VEGF receptors

References

Further reading

External links 
 
 

Clusters of differentiation
Tyrosine kinase receptors